Crown prosecutor is the title given in a number of jurisdictions to the state prosecutor, the legal party responsible for presenting the case against an individual in a criminal trial. The title is commonly used in Commonwealth realms.

Examples
 Crown Prosecution Service (England and Wales)
 Crown prosecutor (Australia)
 Crown prosecutor (New Zealand)
 Crown attorney (Canada)
 "Crown prosecutor" in New Brunswick, Alberta and Quebec) 
 Attorney general
 District attorney

References

Prosecution